The Wrld on GCW (stylized as The WRLD on GCW) was a professional wrestling pay-per-view (PPV) event promoted by Game Changer Wrestling (GCW) that was held on January 23, 2022. The event was held at the Hammerstein Ballroom in New York City, marking the promotion's debut in the Hammerstein Ballroom and the first wrestling event held in the venue since 2019. The event was available on FITE TV and via traditional PPV outlets, making it the first GCW event to air on traditional PPV.

11 matches were contested at the event, including two on the Kickoff pre-show. In the main event, Matt Tremont and Nick Gage defeated The Briscoe Brothers (Jay Briscoe and Mark Briscoe) to win the GCW Tag Team Championship. In other prominent matches, Jon Moxley defeated Homicide to retain the GCW World Championship, Jeff Jarrett defeated Effy, and Matt Cardona defeated Joey Janela. The event also notably saw the GCW returns or debuts of Ruby Soho, Sean Waltman, Brian Myers, Marko Stunt, Virgil, Sabu, and Bill Alfonso.

Production

Background
On October 9, 2021, during their Fight Club event, GCW announced that they would be holding their inaugural event at the Hammerstein Ballroom on January 23, 2022. The event was later revealed to be the fourth edition of the promotion's The Wrld on GCW event. On November 26, the Wrestling Observer Newsletter reported that the event was sold out. On January 12, 2022, it was announced that the event would air on traditional pay-per-view (PPV) outlets in addition to FITE TV, making it the first GCW event to air on traditional PPV outlets. In an article on January 20, DAZN referred to the event as GCW's most "significant event to date". As part of The Wrld on GCW weekend, GCW held the 2022 Indie Wrestling Hall of Fame ceremony on January 22.

In addition to GCW wrestlers, wrestlers from All Elite Wrestling, Impact Wrestling, Lucha Libre AAA Worldwide, and Ring of Honor were scheduled to appear at the event. "Heatwave '98" by Jynx and "Targeted Individual" by Wicca Phase Springs Eternal were the official theme songs for the event.

Storylines
The Wrld on GCW featured eleven professional wrestling matches, with different wrestlers involved in pre-existing scripted feuds, plots and storylines. Wrestlers portrayed either heels or faces as they engaged in a series of tension-building events, which culminated in a wrestling match.

Results

See also
2022 in professional wrestling

References

2022 in professional wrestling
2022 in New York City
January 2022 events in the United States
Events in New York City
Professional wrestling in New York City